Guy Clifton Omer (June 12, 1891 – 1952) was an American football coach and college athletics administrator. He served as the head football coach at Bethany College in Lindsborg, Kansas from 1920 to 1921, compiling a record of 9–6–1. He was also the athletic director at Bethany from 1920 until his resignation in April 1922.

Head coaching record

References
	
	

1891 births
1952 deaths
Bethany Swedes athletic directors
Bethany Swedes football coaches
Kansas State University alumni
People from Mankato, Kansas